Petru Ciarnău (born 5 August 1943) is a Romanian former wrestler who competed in the 1972 Summer Olympics and in the 1980 Summer Olympics.

References

External links
 

1943 births
Living people
Olympic wrestlers of Romania
Wrestlers at the 1972 Summer Olympics
Wrestlers at the 1980 Summer Olympics
Romanian male sport wrestlers